Michelle Hsiao Au (Chinese: 欧晓瑜) is an American anesthesiologist and politician from Georgia. Au has served in the Georgia State Senate as a Democratic member for District 48 since 2021. She is the first Asian American elected to the body. In December 2021, Au announced that she is not running for re-election in Senate district 48 but instead running for election in Georgia state House district 50 due to the Republican controlled state legislature re-drawing her district.

In 2011, Au published her book This Won't Hurt a Bit (and Other White Lies),
which according to a review, "exposes the reality of medical education and the irony within the practice of medicine that physicians are human, but our patients want us to be more".

Early life and education
Au was born to Chinese-American immigrants in New York City. She graduated from Wellesley College in 1999 with a B.A. in Psychobiology, M.D. in 2003 and a Master of Public Health in 2019 from Columbia University.

Electoral history

Personal life
Au lives in Duluth, Georgia, and is married to oculoplastic surgeon Joseph Walrath. The two have three children.

References

External links

 Profile at the Georgia State Senate

Democratic Party Georgia (U.S. state) state senators
21st-century American politicians
Living people
21st-century American women politicians
Women state legislators in Georgia (U.S. state)
American politicians of Chinese descent
Politicians from New York City
American anesthesiologists
Asian-American people in Georgia (U.S. state) politics
Wellesley College alumni
Columbia University Vagelos College of Physicians and Surgeons alumni
People from Duluth, Georgia
American women of Chinese descent in politics
1978 births
Columbia University Mailman School of Public Health alumni
Women anesthesiologists